Ekram Hossain is a professor in the Department of Electrical and Computer Engineering at University of Manitoba, Winnipeg, Manitoba, Canada. Hossain leads the Wireless Communications, Networks, and Services Research Group at University of Manitoba and is editor-in-chief for the IEEE Communications Surveys and Tutorials. In addition, Hossain has held visiting professorships at the School of Computer Engineering, Nanyang Technological University, Singapore (February 2011, August 2009), Tohoku University, Japan (November 2010), and School of Computer Science and Engineering, The University of New South Wales, Australia (June 2008).

Hossain's research in wireless communication networks is widely cited. In 2012, he received the Best Paper Award at the IEEE Wireless Communications and Networking Conference (WCNC) and the IEEE Communications Society Fred W. Ellersick Prize.

References

External links 
 Prof. Hossain's publication list

Year of birth missing (living people)
Living people
Academic staff of the University of Manitoba